Bethany Presbyterian Church is a historic church in Centreville, Mississippi. It was built in 1855, and was added to the National Register in 2003.

References

Presbyterian churches in Mississippi
Churches on the National Register of Historic Places in Mississippi
Greek Revival church buildings in Mississippi
Churches completed in 1855
19th-century Presbyterian church buildings in the United States
1855 establishments in Mississippi
National Register of Historic Places in Amite County, Mississippi